Gastromyzon ingeri is a species of river loach (family Balitoridae or Gastromyzontidae, depending on the source). It is named for Robert F. Inger. It is endemic to Sabah, Borneo, where it occurs in rivers draining into Wallace Bay. It inhabits fast flowing rocky streams and grows to  standard length.

References 

Gastromyzon
Endemic fauna of Borneo
Endemic fauna of Malaysia
Freshwater fish of East Malaysia
Taxa named by Heok Hui Tan
Fish described in 2006